The Conservatives and Social Reformers (abbr. CSR) was a national conservative political party in Italy.

The CSR was formed in October 2012 by Cristiana Muscardini, who had been a long-time MEP with National Alliance (AN) and member of the national assembly of Future and Freedom (FLI), in order to join the European Conservatives and Reformists Group in the European Parliament.

In the 2013 general election the CSR de facto endorsed Act to Stop the Decline, a libertarian party led by Oscar Giannino.

In the 2014 European Parliament election the party supported European Choice, a list sponsored by Alliance of Liberals and Democrats for Europe (ALDE) Party's candidate for President of the European Commission Guy Verhofstadt.

References

External links
 Conservatives and Social Reformers official website

Defunct political parties in Italy
2012 establishments in Italy
Conservative parties in Italy
Political parties established in 2012
Political parties with year of disestablishment missing